Krzysztof Popczyński (born 8 March 1969) is a Polish football coach and former player. As a player, he played as a midfielder.

Career

Playing career
Born in Kraków, Popczyński played for a number of Polish as well as international clubs during his active career. He had his most successful spells in hometown club Hutnik Kraków between 1990 and 1995, where he made 135 appearances and scored 19 goals, and between 1998 and 2001, where he, as a player-manager for Faroese club VB Vagúr managed to score 35 goals throughout three seasons. He furthermore had short spells at Greek club Panionios and Danish club Esbjerg fB.

Coaching career
Popczyński had a notable run as a player-coach in Faroe Islands, where he besides VB Vagúr also managed GÍ Gøta, HB Tórshavn and TB Tvøroyri.

On 27 July 2008, Popczyński was appointed as the new head coach of Danish club Aarhus Fremad who had recently been relegated from the Danish second tier. He coached the club for five years, before being sacked in favour of Jesper Tollefsen in July 2013 after missing promotion play-offs.

In November 2014, Popczyński signed a one-year contract to replace Jesper Borup as the head coach of FC Djursland who were at the bottom of the Danish fourth division. However, he was unable to keep the team up and the club was relegated to the Jutland Series, the fifth tier of Danish football at the end of the season. Another horrific season followed, in which Djursland suffered relegation to the sixth tier, after a decisive 3–1 loss in the penultimate round of the season to Fuglebakken KFUM. Popczyński announced his resignation as of 31 October 2015, a few games befores the second consecutive relegation became a fact.

In October 2017, Popczyński was named the new manager of Horsens Freja competing in the Danish fifth tier. He signed a two-year contract, and would be coaching the first team while completing his Danish Football Union coaching degree. On 5 November 2018, however, he resigned from his position at Horsens Freja citing disagreements over personal ambitions regarding amount of training sessions with the first-team's lacking ambitions.

A month later, on 12 December 2018, Popczyński was announced as the new head coach of Danish third tier club Kjellerup IF, who were bottom of the table. He was sacked by Kjellerup in November 2021.

In July 2022 he was announced as the new manager of Thisted FC in the Danish 2nd Division. He left the club on 7 November 2022.

Honours

Manager
VB Vágur
Faroe Islands Premier League: 2000

GÍ Gøta
Faroe Islands Cup: 2005

HB Tórshavn
Faroe Islands Premier League: 2006

Career statistics

Manager

References

External links
Aarhus-Fremad.dk Playing Profile
Gí Gøta retain their place in the 1st Division

1969 births
Living people
Footballers from Kraków
Polish footballers
Association football midfielders
Esbjerg fB players
Panionios F.C. players
VB Vágur players
Havnar Bóltfelag players
Víkingur Gøta players
Hutnik Nowa Huta players
Polish football managers
Aarhus Fremad managers
Kjellerup IF managers
Polish expatriate sportspeople in the Faroe Islands
Expatriate footballers in the Faroe Islands
Polish expatriate sportspeople in Denmark
Expatriate men's footballers in Denmark
Polish expatriate sportspeople in Greece
Expatriate footballers in Greece